Year of the Spider is the third studio album by American rock band Cold. It was released on May 13, 2003 through Geffen Records. The album was Cold's most commercially successful, debuting at number three on the Billboard album charts, with over 101,000 copies sold in its first week. Early pressings of Year of the Spider were shipped with a DVD and a temporary tattoo of the Cold spider logo. The DVD included the making of the (as well as the actual) video for "Stupid Girl", fan testimonials, and some home video shot during the recording of the album. This is also the last album with guitarists Terry Balsamo and Kelly Hayes.

Background
A year prior to the album's release, the mellow ballad "Gone Away" was released on the WWE Tough Enough 2 soundtrack. Its music video, which met with considerable airplay upon release, listed it as from the album Year of the Spider despite the long wait for its release. "Gone Away" was subsequently used as a hidden track; the song begins at 16:06 after 13 minutes and 13 seconds of silence (a reference to the superstitious nature of the band's previous effort 13 Ways to Bleed on Stage). The song "Came All The Way" was a B-side, which was cut late from the album. It's mentioned on the back cover of the album's booklet. It was later released on the Psi Ops soundtrack.

The album was frequently postponed from its projected release date. As early as April 2002, Year of the Spider was scheduled by Geffen for an October 2002 release. Frontman Scooter Ward also expected Elias Soriano of Nonpoint to contribute, but this did not come to fruition.

Composition and lyrics
With producer Howard Benson on hand, Year of the Spider is significantly more commercial than its dark predecessor, 13 Ways to Bleed on Stage. It features a variety of guitar styles, violin, viola, and cello, and digital effects as well as a number of power ballads. While still dwelling on topics like drug abuse and relationships, other topics are covered. "Cure My Tragedy" deals with the struggle with the cancer Scooter Ward's sister was having during the album's recording. "The Day Seattle Died" is about the deaths of grunge icons Kurt Cobain and Layne Staley. The band originally called the song "Kurt", but decided to pay homage to Staley as well after contemplating the apathy of the media towards his death; "[Staley] dies, and he doesn't even get on the front page of Rolling Stone. I have to do somethin'- not that I matter at all, but it matters to me." The album's final song, "Kill the Music Industry", was not directly about any record label or individual, but the state of the music industry, according to Scooter Ward; "I hate all the bullshit they try to cram down your throat. Every kind of music I hear has no emotion to it anymore- no feeling, no depth in the lyrics."

Singles
"Stupid Girl", served as the album's lead single and was the only Cold single to crack the Billboard Hot 100, where it peaked at number 87. Its music video garnered frequent airplay as well. Like "Gone Away", the introductory song "Remedy" was used by WWE as the theme for the Backlash 2003 pay-per-view.

Following the release of the album's second single, "Suffocate", to radio stations, plans were set-forth for a video to accompany the song. However, for reasons unknown, Geffen refused to make the video or promote the album any further. The stalemate with the label led to frustrations within the band, and in early 2004, Terry Balsamo departed, replacing Ben Moody as lead guitarist in Evanescence. Balsamo was later replaced by ex-Darwin's Waiting Room guitarist Eddie Rendini. The band made efforts to release another single in "Wasted Years", but Geffen stayed true to their earlier promise by not financing or promoting the album any further.

Track listing 
(All songs written by Scooter Ward, except where noted)

"Gone Away" is embedded with "Kill the Music Industry", and begins at 16:06 after 13:13 of silence – a reference to the superstitious nature of their previous effort 13 Ways to Bleed on Stage.

Personnel
Credits adapted from album's liner notes.

Cold
 Scooter Ward – vocals 
 Kelly Hayes – lead guitar
 Terry Balsamo – rhythm guitar, acoustic guitar
 Jeremy Marshall – bass
 Sam McCandless – drums

Additional musicians
 Howard Benson – piano solo , keyboards and programming
 Samuel Fischer – violin 
 Julie Gigante – violin 
 Roland Kato – viola 
 Armen Ksajikian – cello 
 Ana Landauer – violin 
 Songa Lee – violin 
 Phillipe Levy – violin 
 David Low – cello, contractor 
 Deborah Lurie – conductor and string arrangements 
 Simon Oswell – viola 
 David Speltz – cello 
 Sierra Swan – vocals 
 Michael Valerio – string bass 
 Evan Wilson – viola 

Artwork
 Jason Harter – art direction, design
 Olaf Heine – photography

Production
 Dan Adam – digital editing
 Howard Benson – producer, programming
 Ted Jensen – mastering
 Vince Jones – digital editing
 Jason Lader – digital editing
 Chris Lord-Alge – mixing
 Eric Miller – digital editing, additional engineering
 Mike Plotnikoff – engineer, digital editing
 Mark Robertson – concertmaster
 Casey Stone – strings engineer

Management
 Scott Adair – business manager
 Sean Ballhorn – business manager
 Desiree Barlow – management
 Terri DiPaolo – legal representation
 Tom Donnell – merchandise
 Fred Durst – A&R
 Darryl Eaton – booking agent
 Paul Geary – management
 Dhenys Lau – merchandise
 Jenn Littleton – A&R
 Peter Lubin – merchandise
 Martie Muhoberac – production coordination
 Jordan Schur – executive producer, A&R
 Les Scurry – production coordination
 Ron Valeri – management

Charts

Weekly charts

Year-end charts

Singles – Billboard (North America)

Certifications

References

Cold (band) albums
2003 albums
Geffen Records albums
Albums produced by Howard Benson
Flip Records (1994) albums